The Spain national badminton team represents Spain in international badminton team competitions. The Spanish team have never participated in the Thomas Cup but have been in the Uber Cup and Sudirman Cup.

The Spanish team has enjoyed success throughout the individual events. Spain has won one Olympic medal in badminton and three gold medals at the BWF World Championships. All of these medals were won by former world number 1 Carolina Marín. Spain have also been successful in badminton at the European Games where Pablo Abián won gold in the men's singles discipline in 2015.

Summer Olympic Games

List of medalists

World Championships medal table
Updated after XXVI edition (2021), does not include one stripped silver medal from 2014.

List of medalists

Participation in BWF competitions 

Uber Cup

Sudirman Cup

Participation in European Team Badminton Championships

Men's Team

Women's Team

Mixed Team

Participation in European Junior Team Badminton Championships
Mixed Team

Players 
The following players were selected to represent Spain at the 2020 European Men's and Women's Team Badminton Championships.

Male players
Pablo Abián
Alejandro Alcalá
Marc Cardona
Joan Monroy
Luís Enrique Peñalver
Carlos Piris
Tomas Toledano
Alvaro Vazquez
Alberto Zapico
Manuel Vazquez

Female players
Carolina Marin
Clara Azurmendi
Beatriz Corrales
Nerea Ivorra
Claudia Leal
Paula Lopez
Lucía Rodríguez
Ania Setien
Laura Solis
Lorena Uslé

References

Badminton
National badminton teams
Badminton in Spain